Aster alpinus, the alpine aster or blue alpine daisy, is a species of flowering plant in the family Asteraceae, native to the mountains of Europe (including the Alps), with a subspecies native to Canada and the United States. This herbaceous perennial has purple, pink, or blue flowers in summer.

Description

Aster alpinus is a caespitose herbaceous perennial that grows 10-35 cm tall. The bloom color may be blue, indigo, violet, white, or pink. In the UK this plant has gained the Royal Horticultural Society's Award of Garden Merit. Leaves are untoothed, lanceolate-spatulate, and basal. The Latin specific epithet alpinus means alpine and from high mountains above the timber line.

Distribution and habitat
It grows very slowly in clay, silt, loam, silty clay, and sandy clay. Its minimum pH scale is 6 and maximum pH scale is 7.5. It grows erectly in a "single crown" form. Aster alpinus is native to the mountains of Europe such as the Alps and Pyrenees.

It does better in generally cooler climates. Usually it is adapted to clay, silt, loam, silty clay, sandy clay, clay loam, silt loam, sandy loam, silty clay loam and sandy clay loam soils, and prefers low fertility. The plant can tolerate only a minimum temperature of -28 °C / -18.4F after the occurrence of cell damage. It can survive medium heat of fire and requires at least 90 frost free days for proper growth.

Ecology
It is herbaceous and attractive to bees, butterflies, and birds.

Conservation
NatureServe lists variety Aster alpinus var. vierhapperi as Secure Variety (T5) in Canada, but Critically Imperiled (S1) in Ontario and Vulnerable (S3) in Alberta. In the United States, it is Critically Imperiled (S1) in Colorado and Wyoming.

References

alpinus
Alpine flora
Flora of the Alps
Flora of the United States
Flora of the Rocky Mountains
Garden plants of Europe
Garden plants of North America
Plants described in 1753
Taxa named by Carl Linnaeus
Flora of the Carpathians
Flora of the Pyrenees